Antero Lehtonen (born 12 April 1954) is a Finnish former ice hockey player who played a season in the National Hockey League (NHL) with the Washington Capitals during the 1979–80 NHL season.

Career statistics

External links
 

1954 births
Living people
Finnish ice hockey left wingers
Hershey Bears players
JYP Jyväskylä players
Ice hockey people from Tampere
Tappara players
HC TPS players
Undrafted National Hockey League players
Washington Capitals players